Grand Kru County is a county in the southeastern portion of Liberia. One of 15 counties that comprise the first-level of administrative division in the nation, it has eighteen districts. Organized in 1984, its capital is Barclayville. The area of the county measures . As of the 2008 Census, it had a population of 57,106, making it the least populous county in Liberia.

Grand Kru's County Superintendent is Rosalind Sneh. The county is bordered by River Gee County to the northeast, Sinoe County to the northwest, and Maryland County to the southeast. The southern part of Grand Kru borders the Atlantic Ocean.

History
Grand Kru was created in 1984/1985 by the merger of the territories of Sasstown and Kru Coast. Kru Coast territory had previously been part of Maryland County, and Sasstown territory had previously been part of Sinoe county. As of the 1984 Census, the county had a population of 62,791. A UN Mission in Liberia report issued in April 2005 estimated that the population was 71,000.

Demographics
The primary language is Kru, which is spoken in several significantly different dialects around the county.  Some areas identify their language as Buah and Kplio. Liberian English is the language of school instruction.

Districts
The county is divided into four districts:
Buah District
Lower Kru Coast District
Sasstown District
Upper Kru Coast District

Economy
The area has few roads so it has had limited business or residential development. Because of the long period of war since the late 20th century, few investments were made in infrastructure. In June 2005 the UN Integrated Regional Information Network reported that the roads in Grand Kru had decayed and become overgrown by dense bush, rendering them impassable except on foot. The bridge across the Nu River near Barclayville was constructed after the warfare to link the major trade route from Pleebo to Barclayville.

The residents have a subsistence farming economy, based on slash-and-burn techniques of clearing the bush. The most important crops are upland rice, cassava, palm nuts, and along the coast, fishing. Feed corn is grown at higher elevations farther inland. Sugar cane and several varieties of bananas grow in the wetland areas. Cash crops include coffee, cocoa and kola. Locally grown bamboo and piassava palm are widely used for construction, mats and baskets.  Many tropical fruits, domestic and wild, grow in the region including oranges, limes, mangos, soursop, breadfruit and coconut.

The people keep poultry, cattle, sheep and goats to supplement their diets and to use for their products; the animals are found in and around most villages.  Most animals are of pygmy variety, as larger varieties die quickly due to the heat and humidity.

Prior to the civil war, the region's extensive rainforests contained a wide variety of wildlife including wild pigs, bongo, dik-dik, pangolin, civet, pygmy hippo, African buffalo and colobus monkey, all of which are hunted for food and hides. Also found are snakes, and very small populations of forest elephants and leopards. The warfare disrupted their habitats; in addition, many animals were killed in the course of the war and their populations have fallen.

Notable people
Julius Wesseh Nah, footballer

References

External links 
More information on Grebo and Liberian languages
County Development Agenda
Place name codes, Humanitarian Info

 
Counties of Liberia
1984 establishments in Liberia